Scoparia italica is a species of moth in the family Crambidae. It is found in Italy, Austria and Switzerland.

References

Moths described in 1919
Scorparia
Moths of Europe